Joe Sentieri (byname of Rino Luigi Sentieri;  Genoa 3 March 1925, - Pescara 27 March 2007) was an Italian singer and actor.

Career

His first success was the winning of the competition "Canzonissima" in 1959 with his version of the number one hit "Piove (Ciao, ciao bambina)" by Domenico Modugno. In the same year he reached number two and number five in the Italian charts with "Ritroviamoci" and "Milioni di scintille". In 1960 he won the third place with "Quando vien la sera" at the Sanremo Festival. This song was number two in the Italian charts. Another top ten success was "È mezzanotte", which reached number eight.

Perhaps his internationally best known song is "Uno dei tanti". The song written by Carlo Donida and Giulio Rapetti was released in 1961. In 1963 Jerry Leiber and Mike Stoller translated the text into English and released this song under the title "I (Who Have Nothing)". It became one of their greatest hits and was covered more than thirty times, e.g. by Tom Jones, Gladys Knight, Manfred Mann's Earth Band, Ben E. King, Sylvester James, Luther Vandross and Shirley Bassey.

Further songs which had an entry in the Italian charts were "Libellule" (1961), "Lei" (1961), "Cipria di sole" (1962), "Tobia" (1962), "Fermate il mondo (1963) and "Quando ci si vuol bene... (come noi)" (1963).

In the 1960s and the 1970s Sentieri was also seen in some films, e.g. in Howlers in the Dock (1960) with Adriano Celentano and in The Most Beautiful Wife (1970) with Ornella Muti.

Sentieri died from cerebral hemorrhage in a hospital in Pescara. He is survived by his wife Dora and two children.

Selected filmography
 Howlers in the Dock (1960) - Joe il rosso
 The Two Rivals (1960)
 Sanremo - La grande sfida (1960)
 A Qualcuna Piace Calvo (1960) - Cantante del Sing-Sing
 Caccia al marito (1960) - Himself
 Bellezze sulla spiaggia (1961)
 Io bacio... tu baci (1961)
 Tartarin de Tarascon (1962) - Le chanteur dans le wagon du train 
 Appuntamento in Riviera (1962) - Himself
 The Shortest Day (1963) - Soldato (uncredited)
 Three Nights of Love (1964)
 Prega Dio... e scavati la fossa! (1968)
 The Most Beautiful Wife (1970) - Poidomani
 I Am Afraid'' (1977) - Tognon (final film role)

External links
Songs by Joe Sentieri
Biography 

1925 births
2007 deaths
Musicians from Genoa
20th-century Italian  male singers
Actors from Genoa